Dermocystidium is a genus of cyst-forming, eukaryotic fish parasites, the causative agents of dermocystidiosis.

Taxonomic history 
The genus Dermocystidium was described in 1907. It was previously thought to be a genus of fungal parasites, related to the Thraustochytrida and Labyrinthulida (both those groups are now considered to be stramenopiles rather than fungi). Other biologists considered it to be a sporozoan protist.

It was subsequently identified as one of a group of fish parasites (the "DRIP clade") of previously uncertain affiliation, which were later identified as nonanimal, nonfungal opisthokonts, and renamed as Ichthyosporea, and after expansion as Mesomycetozoa. Parasites of crustacea (Dermocystidium daphniae) and molluscs (Dermocystidium marinum) placed in this genus have been found to be likely a bacterium and an alveolate, respectively:  Sayre, Gherna and Wergin (1983) concluded that Dermocystidium daphniae was likely identical to Pasteuria ramosa Metchnikoff, 1888, while D. marinum has been reclassified as Perkinsus marinus.

The frog parasite Dermocystidium ranae has recently been segregated as Amphibiocystidium ranae.

Species 
 Dermocystidium anguillae Spangenberg 1975— a gill parasite of eels
 Dermocystidium branchialis Léger 1914 — a gill parasite of salmonids
 Dermocystidium cochliopodii Valkanov 1967
 Dermocystidium cyprini Červinka & Lom 1974 — a gill parasite of carp
 Dermocystidium erschowii Garkavi, Denisov & Afanas'ev 1980— a skin parasite of carp
 Dermocystidium fennicum Pekkarinen et al. 2003— a skin parasite of perch 
 Dermocystidium gasterostei Elkan 1962 — a parasite of sticklebacks
 Dermocystidium granulosum Sterba & Naumann 1970
 Dermocystidium guyenotii Thélin 1955
 Dermocystidium koi Hoshina & Sahara 1950 — a skin parasite of carp
 Dermocystidium kwangtungensis 
 Dermocystidium macrophagi van de Moer, Manier & Bouix 1988
 Dermocystidium nemachili 
 Dermocystidium penneri (Jay & Pohley 1981) Borteiro et al. 2018
 Dermocystidium percae Reichenbach-Klinke 1950 — a skin parasite of perch 
 Dermocystidium pusulum (Pérez 1907) Pérez 1908
 Dermocystidium salmonis  — a gill parasite of salmon
 Dermocystidium sinensis 
 Dermocystidium sinipercae — a parasite of Chinese perch
 Dermocystidium vejdovskyi Jírovec 1939 — a parasite of pike

References 

Mesomycetozoea
Parasitic opisthokonts
Eukaryote genera
Parasites of fish